Bidens ferulifolia is a North American plant species in the family Asteraceae. Common names include Apache beggarticks and fern-leaved beggarticks.

Distribution
Bidens ferulifolia is native to Mexico.

References

External links

ferulifolia
Flora of Mexico
Plants described in 1798